Ismaël Diomandé (born 7 December 2003) is an Ivorian footballer who currently plays for RFS.

Career

FK Pohronie
Diomandé joined Pohronie in late February 2022 on a loan deal from Rigas Futbola skola. He made his Fortuna Liga debut for the Žiar nad Hronom-based club on 26 February 2022 in an away 1–0 defeat at pod Čebraťom against Ružomberok. Diomandé came on to replace Filip Hašek at played as a right midfielder. While on pitch, he witnessed the match's only goal by Filip Lichý, which sealed the 1:0 victory for Ružomberok. He also made an appearance in a home 0-1 defeat to ViOn Zlaté Moravce on 5 March 2022, when he replaced former Slovak international Martin Chrien in the second half.

On 8 March 2022, RFS announced that Diomandé was recalled from his loan.

References

External links
 
 Futbalnet profile 

2003 births
Living people
Place of birth missing (living people)
Ivorian footballers
Ivorian expatriate footballers
Association football midfielders
Academie de Foot Amadou Diallo players
FK RFS players
FK Pohronie players
Ligue 1 (Ivory Coast) players
Slovak Super Liga players
Expatriate footballers in Latvia
Ivorian expatriate sportspeople in Latvia
Expatriate footballers in Slovakia
Ivorian expatriate sportspeople in Slovakia
21st-century Ivorian people